Edmund Ellis may refer to:
 Edmund Ellis (cricketer), English cricketer and solicitor
 Edmund Elys or Ellis (1633–1708), English clergyman, poet and writer